Eduard Herzog (August 1, 1841 – March 26, 1924) was a Swiss Catholic theologian and cleric who was a native of Schongau, Canton Lucerne. He was the first Christian Catholic bishop of Switzerland.

He studied theology under Karl Joseph von Hefele (1809–1893) at the University of Tübingen, and in 1866 continued his studies at the University of Freiburg. During the following year he received his ordination, and in 1868 began teaching classes at the school of theology in Lucerne. During the Franco-Prussian War he served as a field minister in the Bernese Jura during the summer of 1870. 

In reaction to the First Vatican Council's decision regarding papal infallibility, he expressed his opinions of opposition at the Old Catholic Congress at Cologne in September 1872. Shortly afterwards he served as an "Old Catholic" parish priest in Krefeld, and in March 1873 started serving as priest in Olten. In 1876 he became pastor at the Church of St. Peter and Paul in Bern, as well as professor at the newly established Old Catholic Faculty of the University of Bern.

In June 1876 he was appointed the first Christian Catholic Church bishop of Switzerland, and on September 18, 1876, was consecrated at Rheinfelden by Joseph Hubert Reinkens (1821–1896). Later that year, he was officially excommunicated by Pope Pius IX.

Herzog died in Bern.

Selected publications 
 Über Religionsfreiheit in der helvetischen Republik (About Religious Freedom in the Helvetic Republic); (1884) 
 Leo XIII. als Retter der gesellschaftlichen Ordnung (Leo XIII. As Savior of the Social Order); (1888) 
 Beiträge zur Vorgeschichte der christkatholischen Kirche der Schweiz (Contributions to the History of the Christian Catholic Church of Switzerland); (1896) 
 Predigten und Hirtenbriefe (Sermons and Pastoral Letters), (1886-1901, three volumes)

References 
 This article is based on a translation of an equivalent article at the German Wikipedia, whose references include Herzog, Eduard at Deutsche Biographie.

External links
 Herzog, Eduard, article from Schaff-Herzog Encyclopedia of Religious Knowledge

1841 births
1924 deaths
People from Hochdorf District
Swiss Old Catholic bishops
Swiss Old Catholic theologians
University of Tübingen alumni
University of Freiburg alumni
Academic staff of the University of Bern
People excommunicated by the Catholic Church
19th-century Christian theologians
20th-century Christian theologians